Events from the year 1243 in Ireland.

Incumbent
Lord: Henry III

Events
Walter de Burgh, 1st Earl of Ulster succeeded his father as Lord of Connaught

Deaths
 Maol Eoin Ó Crechain, Archdeacon of Tuam and Doctor of Sacred Theology

References